Sparkleshark is a stage play by Philip Ridley that was originally commissioned for the BTNational Connections, the UK National Theatre's youth theatre scheme in 1997. Sparkleshark had a professional run at the Royal National Theatre in 1999 followed by a tour in 2001.

The play is part of Ridley's sequence of plays for young people The Storyteller Sequence which share thematic similarities, the most distinct being the redemptive power of storytelling.

Synopsis
High up on a tower block roof, Jake writes magical and fantastic stories in secret book to hide from bullies. Polly finds Jake on the roof and realizes that there is more to him than what meets the eye. Natasha joins Polly and finds her talking to a 'geek' shortly followed by Carol and the rest of the bullies. When the gang of boys actually arrive, though, everyone's in for a great surprise. To save himself, Jake weaves his best story yet. It is so good that the gang drop their tough trendy act and demand starring roles in the unfolding fantasy of mystery, danger, love and the final encounter with Sparkleshark. Eventually, they make a pact to meet up every week as a group and tell stories together.

Characters
Jake – 14 years of age, he is a highly imaginative and creative individual creating stories in a notebook. He however is often bullied by others and dismissed as a geek, resulting in him spending most his free time at school hiding between the bins.

Polly – 14 years of age, she only joined school with the others last week. She has noticed Jake despite his  secluded nature and loves his stories. 	

Natasha – 15 years of age, she has looked after Polly in her first week at school coaching her into how to be popular.  She has a troublesome relationship with her father and yearns for his attention.

Carol – 14 years of age, she dresses in the same manner as Natasha suggesting she wants to attain to her popularity. She is attracted to Russell.

Russell – A good-looking 15 year old whom many of the girls are attracted to. He bullies Jake often beating him up with Buzz and Speed.

Buzz and Speed – Both 14 years of age, they are Russell’s sidekicks.

Shane – 16 years of age, having already left school he used to be Natasha’s boyfriend.

Finn – Polly’s 15 year old brother, he is large and has limited speech and communicative skills but possess extreme strength for his age, which makes most of the other children fearful and often refer to him as “The Monster”.

Notable Productions
Premiere

15 July 1997 at the Royal National Theatre, London. Directed by Michelle Wiggins and performed by the Youth Lyric Theatre, Belfast.
Jake - Barum Jeffries
Polly - Nadine Shaker
Natasha - Tara Taylor
Carol - Rachel Lyndsay
Russell - Robert Davison
Buzz - Gordon Barr
Speed - John Gibson
Shane - Conor Ritchie
Finn - Jonathan Haveron

The show was awarded first prize at BT National Connections, receiving a notable standing ovation.  Following the show, Ridley published a book of his short plays, citing each member of the Youth Lyric cast as a thank you to their work.  The cast played the show for a further three years.

Among the admirers of the play's first production was the playwright Patrick Marber, who cited the drama as greatly influencing the writing of his 2004 play The Musicians, which like Sparkleshark was commissioned for The National Theatre Connections several years later in 2004. Marber described his viewing of Sparkleshark as "one of the best nights I've ever had in the theatre, and I thought, 'Oh, I'd love to write one of those one day.' I thought it was an absolutely beautiful play." and commented that "I suppose I ended up writing a piece that conveyed something of how I felt when I saw Sparkleshark - moved by seeing teenagers working together, because every time you open a newspaper, they're portrayed as violent, dysfunctional and dangerous."

Professional Premiere

7 June 1999 at the Royal National Theatre, London. Directed by Terry Johnson.
Jake -Nitzan Sharron
Polly - Jody Watson
Natasha - Maggie Lloyd-Williams
Carol - Kellie Bright
Russell - Chiwetel Ejiofor
Buzz - Nicholas Aaron
Speed - Lee Oakes
Shane - Paul Sharma
Finn - Charlie J Watts

Since its debut Sparkleshark has had many productions around the world, including at the Australian Theatre for Young People.

References

External links
 Sparkleshark NT Education programme: Teachers and Students' Support Pack

British plays
1997 plays
Plays set in London